Hits 94 Volume 1 was the first and only compilation in the Hits 94 series. In 1993, there were 4 volumes of the Hits series, however, the series was discontinued after this release. The album was released on LP, CD and Cassette by Telstar Records and BMG, and it charted at #2 in March 1994.

Like Hits 93 Volume 3, Hits 94 Volume 1 contains 22 tracks, a few of which are edited, some very crudely, in order to fit them all onto an 80-minute cd.

The Hits series then went on temporary hiatus until November 1994, when BMG and Telstar joined forces again for The Ultimate Hits Album.

Number ones included: Things Can Only Get Better, Two Tribes, Babe (Return Remix) and Without You.

Track listing 

CDHITS 941

"Things Can Only Get Better" – D:Ream  
"A Deeper Love" – Aretha Franklin  
"Come Baby Come" – K7  
"Don't Look Any Further (M-People Master Mix)" – M People  
"The Way You Work It (7" Radio Edit)" – E.Y.C.  
"Big Time Sensuality" – Björk  
"Let the Beat Control Your Body" – 2 Unlimited  
"I Miss You (Radio Mix)" – Haddaway  
"Uptight" – Shara Nelson  
"Stay Together" – Suede  
"Cornflake Girl (UK Radio Mix)" – Tori Amos  
"Bat Out of Hell (Radio Edit)" – Meat Loaf  
"Two Tribes" – Frankie Goes to Hollywood
"Babe (Return Remix)" – Take That  
"Downtown (Sweet Radio Mix)" – SWV  
"Little Bit of Heaven" – Lisa Stansfield  
"Forever Now (Radio Edit)" – Level 42  
"Here I Stand" – Bitty McLean  
"There But for the Grace of God" – Fire Island featuring Love Nelson  
"Right in the Night (Fall in Love With Music)" (Radio Edit) – Jam & Spoon  
"Without You" – Harry Nilsson  
"Something in Common (Radio Edit)" – Bobby Brown and Whitney Houston

References 
 Collins Complete UK Hit Albums 1956–2005. Graham Betts. 2005. .

External links 
Hits 93 Volume 4 at Discogs

1994 compilation albums
Telstar Records compilation albums
Hits (compilation series) albums